The 2006 NatWest Pro 40 league season was a 40 over English county cricket competition; colloquially known as the Sunday League. Essex Eagles won the League for the fifth time.

Final standings

Division One

Division two

References 

Pro40
NatWest Group